Laurence John Byers (born 3 March 1941) is a former racing cyclist from New Zealand.

He won the bronze medal in the men's road race at both the 1962 and 1966 British Empire and Commonwealth Games.

His only Olympic appearance was at the 1964 Summer Olympic Games where he placed 10th in the men's road race, he was also part of the team that finished 18th in the men's team time trial.

References

External links
 

1941 births
Living people
New Zealand male cyclists
Commonwealth Games bronze medallists for New Zealand
Cyclists at the 1962 British Empire and Commonwealth Games
Cyclists at the 1966 British Empire and Commonwealth Games
Cyclists at the 1964 Summer Olympics
Olympic cyclists of New Zealand
Sportspeople from Whangārei
Commonwealth Games medallists in cycling
20th-century New Zealand people
Medallists at the 1962 British Empire and Commonwealth Games
Medallists at the 1966 British Empire and Commonwealth Games